The following is a list of episodes for the television show Party of Five. 142 original episodes were broadcast across six seasons.

Series overview

Episodes

Season 1 (1994–95)

Season 2 (1995–96)

Season 3 (1996–97)

Season 4 (1997–98)

Season 5 (1998–99)

Season 6 (1999–2000)

References

External links 

Lists of American teen drama television series episodes